I Need Romance 3 is a 2014 South Korean television series starring Kim So-yeon, Sung Joon, Namkoong Min, Wang Ji-won, Park Hyo-joo, Yoon Seung-ah and Park Yu-hwan. It aired on cable channel tvN from January 13 to March 4, 2014 on Mondays and Tuesdays at 22:00 (KST) for 16 episodes.

This is the third installment of tvN's romantic comedy franchise following the popularity of I Need Romance and I Need Romance 2012. Like its predecessors, the series realistically depicts the friendships, workplace rivalries, and love lives of three career women in their thirties, this time set at a home shopping channel company.

Synopsis
Shin Joo-yeon is a 33-year-old fashion marketing director at a home shopping channel company. She's developed a tough prickly outer shell in order to succeed in the workplace, and has almost given up on the idea of true love after countless failures in the relationship department. She becomes involved in a love triangle with two very different men.

Joo Wan is a 26-year-old songwriter and carefree spirit who returns to Korea after seventeen years living abroad. Up until the age of 9, he was practically raised by his mom's friend and her daughter, Shin Joo-yeon. She only remembers him as a kid she was forced to play with him when her mom was busy, while all his early memories from bath time, to play time, to learning how to tie his shoe, include her. Upon meeting again, he aims to heal Joo-yeon's jaded sense of romance.

Kang Tae-yoon is Joo-yeon's senior colleague and mentor, a workaholic perfectionist who does whatever it takes to meet his goals. He's smooth and refined, but inwardly he doesn't really believe in love after getting his heart broken by his last girlfriend.

Oh Se-ryung is a model-turned-stylist who is Joo-yeon's constant rival at work. She's uninhibited, honest, and always true to her emotions. Though Se-ryung has a line of guys waiting to date her since her school days, Tae-yoon is the only man she's genuinely fallen for, and she'll do anything to get him back.

Lee Min-jung, Jung Hee-jae and Lee Woo-young are Joo-yeon's best friends and office mates. Min-jung prefers casual, no-strings-attached hook-ups, so she's thrown for a loop when her usual sex partner Ahn Min-seok unknowingly moves into the apartment next door and she finds out that she's pregnant with his child. Hee-jae's longtime boyfriend is studying for the civil service exam, but her scrimping and saving for their future is beginning to take its toll on their relationship. Despite being the only male in their circle of friends, Woo-young is considered one of the girls since he was raised by a strong-willed mother and several older sisters; he's always there for Hee-jae and tries to get her to try new things and loosen up.

Cast
 Kim So-yeon as Shin Joo-yeon
 Chae Bin as teen Joo-yeon
 Jung Da-bin as young Joo-yeon
 Sung Joon as Joo Wan
Jung Yoon-seok as young Joo Wan
 Namkoong Min as Kang Tae-yoon
 Wang Ji-won as Oh Se-ryung
 Park Hyo-joo as Lee Min-jung
 Yoon Seung-ah as Jung Hee-jae
 Park Yu-hwan as Lee Woo-young
 Yoo Ha-jun as Ahn Min-seok 
 Jung Woo-shik as Han Ji-seung
 Im Soo-hyun as Se-ryung's assistant
 Alex Chu as PD Lee Jung-ho, Joo-yeon's boyfriend (cameo, ep. 1-3)
 John Park as Joo-yeon's 1st ex-boyfriend (cameo, ep. 1-2)
 Joo Sang-wook as Joo-yeon's 2nd ex-boyfriend (cameo, ep. 1)
 Jung Myung-hoon as Joo-yeon's 3rd ex-boyfriend (ep. 1)
 Kim Ji-seok as dog owner (cameo, ep. 3)
 Park Seung-gun as Joo-yeon and Se-ryung's business partner (ep. 5)
 Youngbin (SF9) as himself (ep. 8-11)
 Han Hye-yeon as herself (ep. 10)
 Jang Min-young as himself (ep. 10)
 Kim Na-young as fashion designer (ep. 11)
 Kim Min-jae as idol trainee

Awards and nominations

References

External links
  
 
 

TVN (South Korean TV channel) television dramas
2014 South Korean television series debuts
2014 South Korean television series endings
Korean-language television shows
South Korean romance television series
South Korean comedy television series
Television series by JS Pictures